Kloster is the German and Scandinavian word for monastery.

It may also refer to:

Places
 Kloster, Styria
 Kloster, Denmark
 Kloster, Sweden
 Klošter, settlement in Slovenia

People
 Asbjørn Kloster (1823–1876), Norwegian social reformer
 Chuck Klosterman (b. 1972), American author and essayist
 Knut Kloster (b. 1929), Norwegian shipping magnate, grandson of Lauritz
 Lauritz Kloster (1870–1952), Norwegian shipping magnate, grandfather of Knut
 Robert Kloster (1905–1979), Norwegian museum director and art historian

Other
 Das Kloster, a collection of magical and occult texts compiled by Johann Scheible

See also
 Klosters
 Closter (disambiguation)

Norwegian-language surnames